Ten More Tales of Grand Illusion is the third album by British metal band Balance of Power. It was released in 1999.

Production and recording 

The album was produced by drummer Lionel Hicks. It was recorded at POD Studios and Summit Studios, both in London, England. Lance King and Hicks were in charge of mixing at Oarfin Studios in Minneapolis, US.

Art design was done by Duffelcoat Creative.

Track listing 
All tracks written by Tony Ritchie and Pete Southern, except where noted.
 "Day Breaker" – 4:22
 "Prisoner of Pride" – 5:53
 "Savage Tears" (Lance King, Ritchie, Southern) – 7:07
 "Under the Spell" – 5:07
 "Blind Man" – 6:51
 "About to Burn" – 5:20
 "Under Innocence Wing" (Southern) – 1:21
 "Sins of the World" (Lionel Hicks, Ritchie, Southern) – 4:48
 "The Darker Side" (Hicks, King, Ritchie, Southern) – 4:32
 "Ten More Tales of Grand Illusion" – 7:31

Personnel

Band members 
 Lance King – lead vocals
 Pete Southern – guitar
 Bill Yates – guitar
 Chris Dale – bass
 Lionel Hicks – drums

Additional musicians 
 Tony Ritchie – vocals
 Doogie White – vocals

Production and recording 
 Lionel Hicks – producer, engineer, mixer
 Lance King – mixer
 Todd Fitzgerald – mixer
 Duffelcoat Creative – art design

References

External links 
Official Website
Ten More Tales... @ Encyclopaedia Metallum
Ten More Tales of Grand Illusion on AllMusic

1999 albums
Balance of Power (band) albums